Green Lake Provincial Park is a provincial park in British Columbia, Canada, located around Green Lake in the South Cariboo-Interlakes district just east of 70 Mile House.

References

Provincial parks of British Columbia
Geography of the Cariboo
Year of establishment missing